SS Panaman was a cargo ship built in 1913 for the American-Hawaiian Steamship Company. The ship was sometimes incorrectly referred to as SS Panamanian. During World War I she was known as USAT Panaman in service for the United States Army and USS Panaman (ID-3299) in service for the United States Navy. Late in her career she was known as SS Marcella for the Italian government.

She was built by the Maryland Steel Company as one of eight sister ships for the American-Hawaiian Steamship Company, and was employed in inter-coastal service via the Isthmus of Tehuantepec and the Panama Canal after it opened. In World War I, USAT Panaman carried cargo and animals to France under charter to the U.S. Army. When transferred to the U.S. Navy in August 1918, USS Panaman continued in the same duties, but after the Armistice, was converted to a troop transport and returned over 11,000 American troops from France. Returned to American-Hawaiian in 1919, Panaman resumed inter-coastal cargo service.

During World War II, Panaman was requisitioned by the War Shipping Administration and initially sailed between New York and Caribbean ports, but with two trips to African ports mixed in. Beginning in mid 1943, Panaman sailed from New York or Boston to ports in the United Kingdom. In late 1946, she was sailing in the Pacific Ocean. In July 1947, American-Hawaiian sold Panaman to the Italian government. Renamed Marcella at that time, she was scrapped in September 1954 at Baltimore.

Design and construction
The contract cost of the ships was set at the construction cost plus an 8% profit for Maryland Steel, but with a maximum cost of $640,000 each. The construction was financed by Maryland Steel with a credit plan that called for a 5% down payment in cash with nine monthly installments for the balance. Provisions of the deal allowed that some of the nine installments could be converted into longer-term notes or mortgages. The final cost of Panaman, including financing costs, was $70.29 per deadweight ton, which came out to just over $715,000.

Panaman (Maryland Steel yard no. 128) was the first ship built under the contract.

Early career
When Panaman began sailing for American-Hawaiian, the company shipped cargo from East Coast ports via the Tehuantepec Route to West Coast ports and Hawaii, and vice versa. Shipments on the Tehuantepec Route would arrive at Mexican ports—Salina Cruz, Oaxaca, for eastbound cargo, and Coatzacoalcos, Veracruz, for westbound cargo—and would traverse the Isthmus of Tehuantepec on the Tehuantepec National Railway. Eastbound shipments were primarily sugar and pineapple from Hawaii, while westbound cargoes were more general in nature. Panaman sailed in this service on the west side of North America.

After the United States occupation of Veracruz on 21 April 1914 (which found six American-Hawaiian ships in Mexican ports), the Huerta-led Mexican government closed the Tehuantepec National Railway to American shipping. This loss of access coupled with the fact that the Panama Canal was not yet open, caused American-Hawaiian to return in late April to its historic route of sailing around South America via the Straits of Magellan. With the opening of the Panama Canal on 15 August, American-Hawaiian ships switched to taking that route.

In October 1915, landslides closed the Panama Canal and all American-Hawaiian ships, including Panaman, returned to the Straits of Magellan route again. Panamans exact movements from this time through early 1917 are unclear. She may have been in the half of the American-Hawaiian fleet that was chartered for transatlantic service. She may also have been in the group of American-Hawaiian ships chartered for service to South America, delivering coal, gasoline, and steel in exchange for coffee, nitrates, cocoa, rubber, and manganese ore.

World War I
At some point after the United States declared war on Germany, the United States Army chartered Panaman for transporting pack animals to Europe in support of the American Expeditionary Force. Although there is no information about the specific conversion of Panaman, for other ships this typically meant that passenger accommodations had to be ripped out and replaced with ramps and stalls for the horses and mules carried. Details about Panamans first two animal transport journeys are not known, but her third trip began 1 April 1918 when she sailed from Newport News, Virginia, with 180 animals for Saint-Nazaire. All 180 animals arrived in good health; none had died, fallen ill, or been injured during the trip. Further details of Panamans Army service are not known.

On 12 August, Panaman was transferred to the United States Navy at New York, and was commissioned into the Naval Overseas Transportation Service (NOTS) the same day. Panaman was loaded with a cargo of general supplies, beef, and a deck-load of trucks and sailed in a convoy from New York on 21 September, arriving at its destination of Saint-Nazaire 6 days later. Back in New York on 7 October, Panaman was outfitted with 821 stalls for horses, and took on a load of horses, general cargo, and 78 officers and men. Sailing in her next convoy on 19 October, she reached Bordeaux on 6 November, five days before the Armistice. After sailing from France on 16 November, she arrived at Newport News eleven days later and underwent repairs.

Panaman sailed on 8 December for New York, where the Board of Survey found her fit for conversion to a troop transport and transferred her from the (NOTS) to the Cruiser and Transport Force. Though sources do not indicate the specific modifications Panaman underwent, typical conversions for other ships included the installation of berths for troops, and adding greatly expanded cooking and toilet facilities to handle the large numbers of men aboard. Similar modifications on Panamans sister ship  took three months, but it is not known how long Panamans refit took. After her conversion, she made six roundtrip voyages to France and brought home 11,393 American personnel. USS Panaman was decommissioned on 18 September 1919, and returned to American-Hawaiian the same day.

Interwar years
Panaman resumed cargo service with American-Hawaiian after her return from World War I service. Though the company had abandoned its original Hawaiian sugar routes by this time, Panaman continued inter-coastal service through the Panama Canal in a relatively uneventful career. Hints at cargos she carried during this time can be gleaned from contemporary news reports from the Los Angeles Times. In April 1923, for example, the newspaper ran a report provided by the Los Angeles Chamber of Commerce that went into great detail listing the contents of the  cargo that Panaman had unloaded. In June 1926, the newspaper ran a photograph that showed the loading of a $1,000 prize bull that was beginning its journey from Los Angeles Harbor to Guatemala City aboard Panaman.

In 1940, Panaman made the news when eleven crewmen mutinied, according to the ship's captain. The ship was held up in San Diego for 18 hours because the men refused to obey the captain's orders. When an agreement brokered by Harry Lundeberg of the Sailors' Union of the Pacific was reached, the men followed orders to get the ship to Los Angeles where the union would attempt to settle the issue. But on arrival in Los Angeles Harbor, the ship was boarded by three FBI agents and two representatives of the Bureau of Marine Inspection and Navigation. After interviewing the captain behind closed doors aboard the ship, the FBI turned the investigation over to the Bureau of Marine Inspection and Navigation, whose two investigators conducted a hearing for the eleven men.

World War II

After the United States entered World War II, Panaman was requisitioned by the War Shipping Administration and frequently sailed in convoys. Though complete records of her sailings are unavailable, partial records indicate some of the ports that Panaman visited during the conflict and some of the cargo. From August 1942 to April 1943, Panaman sailed primarily between New York and Caribbean ports, calling at Trinidad, Key West, Hampton Roads, and Guantánamo Bay. One exception to this pattern was in November 1942 when Panaman sailed on one roundtrip to Durban, South Africa, returning by way of Bahia.

In late April 1943, Panaman sailed from Hampton Roads to Algiers and back, returning to the former in late June. Beginning in July, Panaman sailed from either Boston or New York to Halifax and Liverpool for some eight round trips between then and October 1944. Panaman also visited Belfast Lough in March 1944, Falmouth and Seine Bay in June, and Southampton and Belfast Lough again in July. In October, Panaman sailed from New York to Guantánamo Bay. According to personal letters sent from the Philippines by a crewman to family members, "Panaman" served in the Pacific Theater in the Summer of 1945.

Later career
After the war's end, American-Hawaiian continued operating Panaman for about two more years. In December 1946, the Chicago Daily Tribune reported that Panaman was speeding to Manila with two men ill with polio. The news article reported that the ship had one man die in Saigon from the disease two months prior. In July the following year, the company sold the Panaman to the Italian government. The ship operated under her new name of Marcella and remained in Italian hands until she was scrapped on 15 September 1954 at Baltimore.

Notes

References

Bibliography

 
 
 
 
 
 

Ships built in Sparrows Point, Maryland
World War I merchant ships of the United States
World War I auxiliary ships of the United States
Transport ships of the United States Army
World War II merchant ships of the United States
World War II auxiliary ships of the United States
Ships of Italy
1913 ships
Cargo ships of the United States Navy
Unique transports of the United States Navy